Palmetto is a former community in Plumas County, California, United States. A miner cabin and corral were once located there, but were demolished by the 1930s.

References

Unincorporated communities in Plumas County, California
Unincorporated communities in California